The Moot was a discussion group concerned with education, social reconstruction, and the role of culture in society.  It was convened by J. H. Oldham, editor of the Christian Newsletter, and its participants were mainly Christian intellectuals. Karl Mannheim was a central figure in the group.  Others who attended included T. S. Eliot, John Middleton Murry, Sir Fred Clarke, Michael Polanyi, Reinhold Niebuhr, Paul Tillich, Sir Walter Moberly, John Baillie, Sir Hector Herrington, Geoffrey Vickers, A. R. Vidler, H. A. Hodges, and Adolph Lowe. Catholic historian and independent scholar Christopher Dawson also contributed numerous written submissions, although he was able to attend only two meetings.

The discussion group grew out of a Conference on Church, Community and State held at Oxford in 1937.

More than anything else, the discussions of the Moot revolved around the topic of order and, more particularly, around the problem of how order might be restored in British society and culture in the context of a "world turned upside down". (Mullins and Jacobs, 2006)

The discussions influenced T. S. Eliot's works of cultural criticism The Idea of a Christian Society and Notes Towards the Definition of Culture.

Bibliography 
 Oxford Dictionary of National Biography
 Clary, Betsy Jane Rethinking the Future: The Correspondence Between Geoffrey Vickers and Adolph Lowe Journal of Economic Issues, March, 1994 
 The Moot Papers: Faith, Freedom and Society 1938-1944, ed Keith Clements (London: T & T Clark, 2010) 
 Kojecky, Roger, T.S. Eliot's Social Criticism, 1971, revised edn. 2014. Ch 9 'A Christian Elite' gives an extended account of The Moot.
 Kurlberg, Jonas, "Resisting Totalitarianism: The Moot and a New Christendom", Religion Compass, Volume 7, Issue 12, December 2013, Pages 517-531
 Mullins, Phil and Jacobs, Struan 2006 T.S. Eliot’s Idea of the Clerisy, and its Discussion by Karl Mannheim and Michael Polanyi in the Context of J.H. Oldham's Moot Journal of Classical Sociology July 2006 6 pp147–156 
 Mullins, Phil and Jacobs, Struan 2005 Michael Polanyi and Karl Mannheim, Tradition and discovery the Polanyi society periodical, vol. 32, no. 1, pp. 20–43. 
 Schuchard, Margret, ‘T.S. Eliot and Adolph Lowe in Dialogue The Oxford Ecumenical Conference and After - New Letters and More about the Moot’, AAA: Arbeiten aus Anglistik und Amerikanistik, Bd. 31, H. 1 (2006), pp. 3–24.
 A. R. Vidler, Scenes from a Clerical Life, 1977, includes reminiscences by a core member of The Moot.

External links
 Archival Material at

References 

1938 establishments in the United Kingdom
1947 disestablishments in the United Kingdom
Philosophy events
Organizations established in 1938
Organizations disestablished in 1947